Operation Adder was a military operation conducted by Australia's Services Reconnaissance Department in Timor during World War II in August 1944. A party consisting of two Australian soldiers, Captain John Grimson and signaller Ernest Gregg, and three Portuguese Timorese, was dropped on Timor.

Japanese intelligence knew of the operation and ambushed the team on the morning of 24 August at Cape lie Hoi, during which Gregg and one of the Timorese was killed. There was another skirmish later that day after which Captain Grimson was found dead through self-inflicted wounds. The two surviving Timorese were later killed.

See also
Operation Semut
Operation Agas
Naval Base Borneo

References

Further reading

Adder
1944 in Portuguese Timor
Adder
South West Pacific theatre of World War II